The following is a list of Manhattan Jaspers basketball head coaches. There have been 24 head coaches of the Jaspers in their 117-season history.

Manhattan's current head coach is RaShawn Stores. He was named as the Jaspers' interim head coach in October 2022, replacing Steve Masiello, who was fired just before the 2022–23 season.

References

Manhattan

Manhattan Jaspers basketball, men's, coaches